Zimní stadion Ivana Hlinky is an indoor sporting arena located in Litvínov, Czech Republic, named after Czech ice hockey player and coach Ivan Hlinka. The capacity of the arena is 5,944 people and was built in 1955. It is currently home to the HC Litvínov ice hockey team.

External links 
Information at the official website

Indoor ice hockey venues in the Czech Republic
1955 establishments in Czechoslovakia
Sports venues completed in 1955
20th-century architecture in the Czech Republic